The 2020 1. deild kvinnur (also known as Betri deildin kvinnur for sponsorship reasons) was the 36th season of women's league football in the Faroe Islands. KÍ Klaksvík were the defending champions, having won their 18th title the previous season. The season started on 24 May (delayed due to the COVID-19 pandemic) and ended on 17 October. KÍ Klaksvík once again won the championship.

After the football season was over the club Víkingur proclaimed that they wanted to end the co-operation with the two other clubs ÍF and B68. They wanted to continue on their own to develop football for girls and women from the next season and in the future.

Teams

In 2020 the league will be contested by six teams, the same as in 2018, one team more from last season's five, as the women's team from the club NSÍ from Runavík entered the league.

League table

Managers

Top goalscorers

Source: fsf.fo - Faroe Islands Football Association

References

1. deild kvinnur seasons
Faroe Islands
women
women
1. deild kvinner, 2020